Candidates for Marriage is a 1958 Austrian-West German comedy film directed by Hermann Kugelstadt and starring Beppo Brem, Paul Hörbiger and Gerlinde Locker.

The film's sets were designed by the art director Wolf Witzemann. It was shot at the Schönbrunn Studios in Vienna and on location around the city.

Cast
 Beppo Brem as Valentin Obermeier
 Paul Hörbiger as Ferdinand Haslinger
 Gerlinde Locker as Monika Urban
 Rudolf Carl as Dippelmoser
 Lucie Englisch as Regerl Obermeier
 Walter Korth as Hans Obermeier
 Lizzi Holzschuh as Mathilde Urban
 Fritz Muliar as Ein Wachmann
 Ethel Reschke as Hilde Haslinger
 Wolfgang Jansen as Wolfgang
 Cissy Kraner as Marlene, Barsängerin
 Erwin v. Gross as Bob, Jazzsänger
 Hilde Rom as Frau Maria, eine Heiratslustige
 Herta Konrad as Frau Klara, eine Heiratslustige
 Brigitte Antonius as Frau Grete, eine Heiratslustige
 Hertha Kratz as Frau Bürgermeisterin
 Ruth Winter as Valli, ihre Tochter
 Walter Varndal as Herr Prebichl
 Hugo Gottschlich as Herr Brunbirl
 Else Rambausek as Frau Powondra
 Felix Czerny as Authaller
 Heinrich Fuchs as Der Vorstand
 Peter Gerhard as Richter
 Fritz Heller as Chef des Praterrestaurants

References

Bibliography 
 Bock, Hans-Michael & Bergfelder, Tim. The Concise CineGraph. Encyclopedia of German Cinema. Berghahn Books, 2009.

External links 
 

1958 films
Austrian comedy films
West German films
German comedy films
1958 comedy films
1950s German-language films
Films directed by Hermann Kugelstadt
Schönbrunn Studios films
Films scored by Hans Lang
1950s German films